Proeulia schouteni is a species of moth of the family Tortricidae. It is found in Chile in the Maule and Bío Bío regions.

The wingspan is 21 mm. The ground colour of the forewings is cream yellow in the distal third suffused and/or strigulated (finely streaked) with pale ferruginous. The hindwings are cream, mixed with pale brownish in the anal and cubital parts.

Etymology
The species is named in honour of Mr. Rob T. A. Schouten.

References

Moths described in 2010
Proeulia
Moths of South America
Taxa named by Józef Razowski
Endemic fauna of Chile